John Stanley may refer to:

Arts and entertainment
John Stanley (cartoonist) (1914–1993), comic book writer and artist best known for Little Lulu
John Stanley (composer) (1712–1786), English composer and organist
John Stanley (playwright) (born 1966), British playwright and screenwriter
John Stanley (radio broadcaster), Australian radio presenter
John Mix Stanley (1814–1872), American artist-explorer

Politics and government 
Sir John Stanley (KG) (c. 1350–1414), Lord Lieutenant of Ireland and King of Mann
Sir John Stanley (died 1437) (c. 1386–1437), his son, King of Mann, MP for Lancashire
Sir John Stanley, 1st Baronet (1663–1744), Chief Secretary for Ireland and Member of Parliament (MP) for Gorey
Sir John Thomas Stanley, 6th Baronet (1735–1807), British landowner and amateur scientist
John Stanley (Hastings MP) (1740–1799), British MP for Hastings
John Stanley, 1st Baron Stanley of Alderley (1766–1850), British peer and politician
Sir John Stanley (judge) (1846–1931), Chief Justice of North Western Provinces, British India
John Stanley, 18th Earl of Derby (1918–1994), British peer, landowner and businessman
Sir John Stanley (Tonbridge and Malling MP) (born 1942), British politician

Other
Neck Stanley (John Wayman Stanley, 1905–1959), American baseball player

See also